The Norwegian Society (Norske Selskab) was a literary society for Norwegian students in Copenhagen active from 1772 to 1813. Its members included authors, poets and philosophers. The Norwegian Society was formed in 1772 by Ove Gjerløw Meyer. Their meeting place was Madame Juel's Coffeehouse (madame Juels Kaffehus) in the Læderstræde.

It was a gentlemen's club, with the exception of the waitress Karen Bach and the poet Magdalene Sophie Buchholm, and the meetings were lively with speakers, song and discussion, poetry recitation improvisations and relatively significant intakes of punch. The club considered itself culturally conservative and devoted to the rationalistic empirical style of Ludvig Holberg.

The members of the Norwegian Society are often viewed as playing a central role in the wakening of Norwegian patriotic awareness at the close of the 18th century. Many of the poems and plays had patriotic themes. The society was discontinued in 1813 after the battle was won to establish the first Norwegian university, but a new gentlemen's club with the same name started in 1818.

Central members 

 Johannes Ewald (1743–1781)
 Johan Nordahl Brun (1745–1816) 
 N. K. Bredal
 Magdalene Sophie Buchholm (1758–1825), only female member
 Ove Gjerløw Meyer
 Johan Vibe (1748–1782)
 Søren Monrad
 Niels Treschow (1751–1833)
 Jakob Edvard Colbjørnsen
 Claus Fasting
 Claus Frimann (1746–1829)
 P. H. Frimann
 Jonas Rein
 Edvard Storm
 Jens Zetlitz
 Johan Herman Wessel (1742–1785)

References

External links
 Source

Norwegian literature
Organizations established in 1772
1772 establishments in Denmark
1813 disestablishments in Denmark
Organizations disestablished in 1813
Organizations based in Copenhagen
Norwegian nationalism
Denmark–Norway relations
Diaspora organizations in Denmark